The Jackson Sun is  a daily newspaper published in Jackson, Tennessee, and is one of western Tennessee's major newspapers, delivered to 13 counties. The newspaper is owned by Gannett. Its history dates back over 150 years.

See also

List of newspapers in Tennessee

References

External links

Official mobile website

Newspapers published in Tennessee
Jackson, Tennessee
Gannett publications